Angel Kodinov (born 4 September 1997) is a Bulgarian sprint canoeist. He competed in the men's C-1 1000 metres event at the 2016 Summer Olympics.

References

External links

1997 births
Living people
Bulgarian male canoeists
Olympic canoeists of Bulgaria
Canoeists at the 2016 Summer Olympics
Sportspeople from Plovdiv
European Games competitors for Bulgaria
Canoeists at the 2019 European Games
ICF Canoe Sprint World Championships medalists in Canadian